Admas University Garowe Campus is a tertiary institution in Garowe, the administrative capital of the autonomous Puntland region in northeastern Somalia. A campus of the Addis Ababa-based Admas University, it was established in March 2014. The university also has a second campus in Hargeisa, the administrative capital of the autonomous Somaliland region in northwestern Somalia.

Faculties
Faculty of Business
Accounting
Economics
Management
Marketing Management

Faculty of Informatics
Computer Science
Information Technology
Office Administration and Technology Systems

Faculty of Social Sciences
Developmental Studies
Sociology
Educational Planning and Management

Faculty of Health Sciences
Health Officer

See also
Admas University College–Hargeisa

References

(Warsaxaafadeed+sawiro) Jaamacad cusub oo laga furay magaalada Garowe ee Caasimada Puntland

External links
Admas University College

Universities in Somalia
Garowe
Educational institutions established in 2014
2014 establishments in Somalia